

221001–221100 

|-id=019
| 221019 Raine ||  || Raine Ann Krecic (born 2011), the granddaughter of American discoverer James Whitney Young || 
|-id=026
| 221026 Jeancoester ||  || Jean Coester (born 1939), long-time colleague of the French discoverer Bernard Christophe || 
|-id=073
| 221073 Ovruch ||  || Ovruch, the ancient city in northern Ukraine. || 
|}

221101–221200 

|-id=149
| 221149 Cindyfoote ||  || Cindy N. Foote (born 1957), an American amateur astronomer who obtained her first telescope on a dare with her husband (see below). || 
|-id=150
| 221150 Jerryfoote ||  || Jerry L. Foote (born 1942), an American amateur astronomer who moved to Utah in the 1990s with his wife, Cindy  (see above), where they established the Vermillion Cliffs Observatory  near the border to Arizona. || 
|}

221201–221300 

|-id=230
| 221230 Sanaloria ||  || Sanaloria is an imaginary planet inhabited by humankind in the future. Developed by David, the son of the discoverer, and his friend Maxime Delorme, the universe of Sanaloria depicts a cynical vision of our species. A video game first, its philosophy still inspires musical, graphical and literary creations. || 
|}

221301–221400 

|-bgcolor=#f2f2f2
| colspan=4 align=center | 
|}

221401–221500 

|-id=465
| 221465 Rapa Nui ||  || Rapa Nui, the name of Easter Island in the Polynesian Rapanui language || 
|}

221501–221600 

|-id=516
| 221516 Bergen-Enkheim ||  || Bergen-Enkheim is the easternmost borough of Frankfurt am Main in Germany || 
|}

221601–221700 

|-id=628
| 221628 Hyatt ||  || Hyatt M. Gibbs (born 1938), a professor of optical sciences at the University of Arizona || 
|-id=698
| 221698 Juliusolsen ||  || Julius Olsen (1873–?) was Dean of Hardin-Simmons University (Abilene, TX) from 1902 until 1940. || 
|}

221701–221800 

|-id=712
| 221712 Moleson ||  || The Moleson, a 2002-metre mountain in the Swiss Prealps, overlooking the region of Gruyeres in the canton of Fribourg. || 
|-id=769
| 221769 Cima Rest ||  || The Cima Rest Observatory is situated in Magasa in a nice and isolated area of the Italian Alps, at an elevation of 1250 meters. || 
|}

221801–221900 

|-bgcolor=#f2f2f2
| colspan=4 align=center | 
|}

221901–222000 

|-id=908
| 221908 Agastrophus ||  || Agastrophus, who is a Paionian hero in Homer's Iliad, famed for his spear, who fought with the Trojans in the Trojan War and who was killed by Diomedes. Agastrophus was the son of Paeon and brother of Laophoon. || 
|-id=917
| 221917 Opites ||  || Opites was a Greek soldier, a ruler of the Danaans, who was killed by Hektor in the battle for Troy. || 
|-id=923
| 221923 Jayeff ||  || June F. Falla (born 1945), the wife of British discoverer Norman Falla || 
|}

References 

221001-222000